The Astris was a liquid rocket engine burning the hypergolic propellant combination of Aerozine 50 and N2O4. A single engine powered Astris third stage of the failed Europa rocket.

On November 29, 1968, its inaugural flight, the Astris third stage exploded. On the second attempt on July 1969, the Astris engine failed to start. On the third attempt on June 11, 1970, the stage performed correctly, but the fairing failed to separate. On November 5, 1971, the Europa II launched from CSG ELA-1, had a mishap due to structural failure of the third stage. After this last failure the project was definitely cancelled.

See also
 Astris (rocket stage)
 Europa (rocket)
 Viking (rocket engine)

References

Rocket engines using hypergolic propellant
Rocket engines using the pressure-fed cycle